The West Coast Historical and Mechanical Society is based at the Shantytown Heritage Park. The society has three steam locomotives and one diesel. One loco, Kaitangata (otherwise known as "Katie") is a 0-6-0st steam locomotive built by Sharp, Stewart & Co. in 1896. It is an improved version of the 88 F class locomotives.

Locomotives and rolling stock
The society has 5 steam locomotive plus a diesel shunter:
 An 'A' class locomotive class locomotive (otherwise known as "Opossum")
 Heisler 1494
 Climax 1203
 Kaitangata 4270 "Katie"
 L 508 "Gertie"
 TR 107 "Rosie"

They also have in care of the remains of A 65 and two bush diesel locos from the Dispatch Foundry. Plus two other locos from the foundry with one on static display and one awaiting restoration. TR 38 was once preserved by the Society, but was on-sold to The Plains Railway on 4 January 1982.

Locomotives

References

External links
 Shantytown Heritage Park's official website

Heritage railways in New Zealand
Railway museums in New Zealand
Grey District